Anastasia Pavlyuchenkova is the defending champion, but decided to participate at the Dubai Tennis Championships instead.

Tímea Babos won her first WTA title after defeating Alexandra Cadanțu 6–4, 6–4 in the final.

Seeds

Draw

Finals

Top half

Bottom half

Qualifying

Seeds

Qualifiers

Draw

First qualifier

Second qualifier

Third qualifier

Fourth qualifier

References
Main Draw
Qualifying Draw

Monterrey Open - Singles
2012 Singles